The Criminal Justice Act 1953 is a Malaysian law which enacted relating to penal servitude, methods of imprisonment and whipping; and for purposes connected therewith.

Section 3 provides that a sentence of imprisonment for life is deemed as 30 years imprisonment. Previously, a life sentence was deemed to be 20 years until the Act was amended by the Criminal Justice (Amendment) Act 2007. However, there are some Acts (e.g. Firearms (Increased Penalties) Act 1971) that provides for the imprisonment for the duration of the natural life of the person sentenced, notwithstanding Section 3 of the Criminal Justice Act 1953.

Structure
The Criminal Justice Act 1953, in its current form (1 June 2013), consists of 6 sections and no schedule (including 3 amendments), without separate Part.
 Section 1: Short title and application
 Section 2: Abolition of penal servitude, rigorous and simple imprisonment
 Section 3: Life sentences
 Section 4: Abolition of whipping with cat-o’-nine tails, etc.
 Section 5: (Omitted)
 Section 6: (Omitted)

See also
 Criminal Justice Act

References

External links
 Criminal Justice Act 1953 

1953 in Malaya
Legal history of British Malaya
1953 in law
Malaysian federal legislation